Pri'el was a moshav and Israeli settlement in the Sinai Peninsula. 

The moshav was established in early 1978 in the Yamit region of Sinai by a group of Jewish immigrants from the Soviet Union. 

As a result of the Israel-Egypt Peace Treaty in 1979, Israel was required to evacuate all its settlements in the peninsula. As a result, in 1982 all the homes were evacuated and bulldozed.

References

Populated places established in 1978
Former Israeli settlements in Sinai
Former moshavim
1978 establishments in the Israeli Military Governorate
1982 disestablishments in the Israeli Military Governorate